The 1957 Indian general election polls were held in the Andhra Pradesh state for its 43 seats. The state was formed then recently in 1956 by combining the erstwhile Andhra state state and Telugu-speaking areas of Hyderabad State. Indian National Congress has swept the elections by bagging 37 seats.

References

External links
 Website of Election Commission of India
 CNN-IBN Lok Sabha Election History

1957 Indian general election
Indian general elections in Andhra Pradesh